The 2010 Swedish Touring Car Championship season was the 15th and last Swedish Touring Car Championship (STCC) season. Four of the race weekends were held together with the Danish Touring Car Championship and the results from these races also counted towards the Scandinavian Touring Car Cup. From 2011, the new Scandinavian Touring Car Championship replaced both the Swedish and the Danish Touring Car Championships.

Teams and drivers
The official entry list for the 2010 STCC season was released on March 20. All teams were Swedish-registered.

Race Calendar
The calendar for the 2010 season was published in November 2009. As a first step towards the planned merger with the Danish Touring Car Championship, four of the races will be held together with DTC.

*Joint STCC and DTC races.

Results and standings

The points system used for both the main championship and Semcon Cup is the new FIA system of 25-18-15-12-10-8-6-4-2-1, awarded to the top ten finishers of each race. In case of ties in points, the championship positions are determined by the classification in the latest race.

Races

* In the joint STCC and DTC races, only the highest placed STCC driver/team is listed.

Drivers Championship

† — Drivers did not finish the race, but were classified as they completed over 90% of the race distance.

Teams Championship

References

External links
STCC Official Website (Swedish)
TouringCarTimes – STCC news in English

Swedish Touring Car Championship seasons
Swedish Touring Car Championship
Swedish Touring Car Championship season